Datuk Seri Dr. Edmund Santhara Kumar Ramanaidu is a Malaysian politician,	businessman and entrepreneur who served as Deputy Minister of Tourism, Arts and Culture in the Barisan Nasional (BN) administration under former Prime Minister Ismail Sabri Yaakob and former Minister Nancy Shukri from August 2021 to the collapse of the BN administration in November 2022, Deputy Minister of Federal Territories in the Perikatan Nasional (PN) administration under former Prime Minister Muhyiddin Yassin and former Minister Annuar Musa from March 2020 to the collapse of the PN administration in August 2021 and the Member of Parliament (MP) for Segamat from May 2018 to November 2022. He is a member of the Parti Bangsa Malaysia (PBM) and was an associate member of the Malaysian United Indigenous Party (BERSATU), a component party of the PN coalition and he created history of becoming the first non-indigenous politician to join BERSATU as an associate member. Previously was a member, National Integration Bureau chairman and Coordinator of Segamat of the People's Justice Party (PKR), a component party of the Pakatan Harapan (PH) opposition coalition. He resigned from PKR and joined BERSATU in February 2020 Sheraton Move. He served as the 1st Deputy President of PBM from October 2022 to February 2023. In the November 2022 Malaysian general elections, he chose not to seek reelection as an MP and defend the Segamat seat that he had won in the previous election as a PKR candidate for personal reasons.

Early life and education
Santhara was born on 3 April 1971 at Hospital Kluang, to his parents who hails from Sembrong Estate, Layang-Layang, Johor. He obtained his Doctorate of Business Administration (DBA) from University of Newcastle, Australia.

Corporate career
Santhara joined Masterskill in October 2004 as the Director of Business Development, where he was tasked with improving the company's growth opportunities. In January 2005, he was appointed as the Chief Operating Officer, responsible for overall management. In September of the same year, Santhara was promoted to Chief Executive Officer. According to the group's website, Masterskill is the largest nursing and allied health sciences education group in Malaysia and one of the largest in the Asia Pacific region.

In 2017, Santhara announced his decision to quit as the CEO of Masterskill Education Group Bhd (MEGB) to concentrate on his political career.

Political career
Santhara contested the Hulu Selangor parliamentary seat as an independent in the 2013 general election (GE13) but gained only 999 votes. He stood in the 2018 general election (GE14) in the Segamat parliamentary seat, representing PH-PKR, and was elected with 52.11% of the vote.

Controversies
Santhara had gone on a 55-day holiday trip to visit his wife and children in New Zealand raising allegations that he controversially skipped duties without approved leave amid the travel restrictions during COVID-19 pandemic at the end of 2020. He has also been questioned of practising the government double-standards for being allowed to under-go the quarantine at his luxury home whle ordinary people would has to stay at hotel rooms for the 10-day period.

Election results

Awards and honours

Professional membership fellowships
Santhara has obtained following fellowships.
 Honorary Fellow of Association of Business Executives (ABE), U.K
 Fellow of Charted Institute of Marketing (FCIM), U.K
 Fellow of Malaysian Institute of Management (FMIM)
 Fellow of Malaysian Institute of Human Resources Management (FMIHRM)
 Associate Fellow of Harvard Business School Alumni Club of Malaysia

Awards and recognitions
 Malaysia's Ernst & Young Entrepreneur of The Year Award (2007)
 JCI Malaysia Ten Outstanding Young Malaysian (TOYM) Award – Business, Economic and Entrepreneurial Accomplishment (2009)
  Asia HRD Congress 2011 Awards - Contribution to Society (2011)
 JCI Ten Outstanding Young Persons of the World award (JCI TOYP) Award – Business, Economic and/or Entrepreneurial Accomplishment (2011)

Honours of Malaysia
  :
  Grand Commander of the Order of the Territorial Crown (SMW) – Datuk Seri (2021)
  :
 Justice of Peace (Jaksa Pendamai) (JP) (2012)
  :
  Knight Companion of the Order of the Crown of Pahang (DIMP) – Dato' (2007)
  Grand Knight of the Order of Sultan Ahmad Shah of Pahang (SSAP) – Dato’ Sri (2009)
  :
  Knight Commander of the Order of the Perak State Crown (DPMP) – Dato' (2009)
  :
  Commander of the Order of Kinabalu (PGDK) – Datuk (2010)

Honorary degrees
PhD in Double Standards and Lack of Integrity; awarded by the Backdoor University of Political Science (2020)

External links
 
 Datuk Seri Santhara Profile.pdf

References 

Living people
1971 births
People from Johor
Malaysian people of Indian descent
Malaysian politicians of Tamil descent
Malaysian businesspeople
Former Malaysian United Indigenous Party politicians
Former People's Justice Party (Malaysia) politicians
Members of the Dewan Rakyat
Commanders of the Order of Kinabalu
21st-century Malaysian politicians